Mina Adampour ( born 1987) is a Norwegian-Iranian commentator, columnist and medical doctor. She is a board member of His Royal Highness Crown Prince Haakon and Her Royal Highness Crown Princess Mette-Marit's Foundation and is appointed by the Norwegian Directorate of Health as a committee member to the Karl Evang Prize.

Early life and education
Mina Adampour was born in Karachi, Pakistan and has an Iranian background. She attended Foss Upper Secondary School in Oslo. Adampour has lived in both Bodø and Oslo. She's currently a medical doctor graduate from the University of Oslo.

Career
Adampour was involved in politics from an early age. In 2003, at age-sixteen, she organized a large anti-war demonstration outside the US Embassy. Even though she wasn't active in the revolutionary socialist party Red Electoral Alliance, she was asked to run as their candidate in the 2007 local elections and accepted. After the election, she gained a seat in the borough of Grünerløkka. However, Adampour declined to represent the new communist party Red at the 2011 local elections

She has written extensively and have been published in Dagsavisen, Klassekampen, Ny Tid and Utrop. She is also a columnist in the largest newspaper in Norway, Aftenposten. Adampour is frequently seen in public debates.

Adampour received national attention when Queen Sonja of Norway and Crown Princess Mette-Marit visited her family home.

References

External links
 Youth Against Racism (In Norwegian)
 Official Twitter account

1987 births
Living people
Writers from Oslo
Politicians from Oslo
Red Party (Norway) politicians
21st-century Norwegian journalists
Norwegian women journalists
Norwegian Trotskyists
Norwegian people of Iranian descent
Norwegian women writers
Norwegian columnists
Norwegian women columnists
People from Karachi